Melody Fall (often shortened to MF) is an Italian pop punk band, that formed in 2003 in Turin.

History
In January 2005, Fabrizio Pan (Vocals, Guitar), PierAndrea Palumbo (Bass, backing vocals) and Marco Ferro (Drums) were in their first year of high school in Turin. They wanted to play music like pop punk bands Blink-182, Sum 41 and New Found Glory. They formed a band called Ducks 33, and started to play live in Turin at band contests and schools. After a year of shows, they became more well-known, and decided to record their first demo. Andrea Fusini, an Italian producer, saw the band at a show in July 2005 and decided to produce an EP for them, Melody Fall EP. Guitarist Davide Pica was added to the lineup around the start of the recording process, and the band decided to change their name to Melody Fall. The EP wasn't released at first in Italy. European interest for the band arrived only after the release, and big selling of the EP in Japan with Radtone Records. Just two months later, the band signed with Wynona Records, and toured Italy, Europe and Japan.
In February 2007, the band released their debut album, Consider Us Gone. The album was sold in Europe and Japan. A European tour with The New Story followed. Consider Us Gone Sold more than 60000 copies in Japan, and 30000 in Europe. The shared the stage with a lot of Big Bands like STRUNG OUT, THE APPLESEED CAST, DUST BOX...  The band then signed a contract with Universal Music in late 2007.
In February 2008, the band released a new self-titled album, their first with the label Universal Music. It is also their first album where Fabrizio Pan sings in Italian. They played at the most important Festival of Italian Music, "58° Festival di Sanremo" with more than 10 million viewers. On 17 May 2008, the band released a split album with American pop punk band Better Luck Next Time called Hybrid. It was released on Radtone Music, and was only available in Japan. The band continued to tour. In 2010 the second full-length album called into the Flesh hit the stores, with a new Label in Italy (Nunflower, distributed by Universal) and Japan (Radtone Music). Into the Flesh is Melody Fall's highest selling album with more than 80000 copies. After into the Flesh came a new European tour. In 2012, the band produced a new full-length album Virginal Notes. The album is a mix of metal, rapping, melodic and scream voice, rather than pop punk. It also featured a cover song by Mike Shinoda "Remember The Name". In 2012, the band went on tour with Forever the Sickest Kids. After that, the band had a pause of 2 years. Marco left the band, but the band found a new drummer, Andrea Bessone. 
Meanwhile, Fabrizio Pan, created a new Label called "Pan Music Production". He became the Producer of the Band and Recorded Mixed and Mastered their 5 Full Length Album "The Shape of Pop Punk to come". 
The Album hit the stores in Japan in 2014 with Radtone Records.
A new market opened their doors to Melody Fall in 2015... they toured in CHINA for the first time. A 14 Tour Dates no stop was an amazing experience and the Band had the chance to Release their Album over There. Meanwhile, Pier left the band to grow wine.
In 2016 they Toured again in Japan for the third time.
In 2017 they make a big come back in Italy with the "POPPUNK.IT" tour 2017. It was the 10 years anniversary of "Consider Us Gone" before stopping to write a new Album that will be released in 2018..

Discography

Albums 
Consider Us Gone (2007)
Melody Fall (2008)
Hybrid (2009)
Into the Flesh (2010)
Virginal Notes (2012)
The Shape of Pop-Punk to Come (2014)
10 Years (2016)
The Middle Age of the Dinosaurs (2018)

EPs
Melody Fall EP (2006)

Splits
Hybrid (2008)

Singles

References

External links
Official band website
Universal Music official website
Band(B&)Recordings official website
Radtone Music official website

Italian pop punk groups
Musical groups established in 2003